The S-400 Triumf ( – Triumf; translation: Triumph; NATO reporting name: SA-21 Growler), previously known as the S-300 PMU-3, is a mobile, surface-to-air missile (SAM) system developed in the 1990s by Russia's NPO Almaz as an upgrade to the S-300 family. 

The S-400 went into service on 28 April 2007. The first battalion of the newest surface-to-air missile systems assumed combat duty on 6 August.

Development
The development of the S-400 system began in the late 1980s and was announced by the Russian Air Force in January 1993. On 12 February 1999 successful tests were reported at Kapustin Yar in Astrakhan, and the S-400 was scheduled for deployment by the Russian army in 2001. Dr. Alexander Lemanskiy of Almaz-Antey was the Chief Engineer on the S-400 project.

In 2003, it became apparent that the system was not ready for deployment. In August, two high-ranking military officials expressed concern that the S-400 was being tested with "obsolete" interceptors from the S-300P system and concluded that it was not ready for deployment. The completion of the project was announced in February 2004. In April, a ballistic missile was successfully intercepted in a test of the upgraded 48N6DM missile. In 2007, the system was approved for service. Russia had accepted for service the 40N6 long-range missile for the S-400 air-defence system, a source in the domestic defense industry told TASS news agency in October 2018.

The S-400 Triumf and Pantsir missile system can be integrated into a two-layer defense system.

Structure

S-400 missile systems are organized around the 30K6E administration system, which can coordinate eight divisions (battalions).
The 55K6E is a command and control center based on the Ural-532301. The 91N6E is a panoramic radar detection system with a 600-kilometre (370 mi) range and protection against jamming, and is mounted on an MZKT-7930. Six battalions of 98ZH6E surface-to-air missile systems (an independent combat system) can track no more than six targets on their own, with an additional two battalions if they are within a  range. The 92N6E (or 92N2E) is a multi-functional radar with a  range, which can track 100 targets. The 5P85TE2 launcher and the 5P85SE2 on a trailer (up to 12 launchers) are used for launch. The 48N6E, 48N6E2, 48N6E3, 48N6DM, 9M96E, 9M96E2, and the ultra-long-range 40N6E missiles have been authorized by a Russian presidential decree.

Optional elements of the S-400 (98ZH6E) include the 15I6ME–98ZH6E, which extends coverage 30, 60 and 90 km (19, 38 and 57 mi) from that provided by the 30K6E. The 96L6E has a  detection range. The 40B6M is housing for the 92N6E or 96L6E radar. The Protivnik-GE is an anti-stealth UHF radar with a  range. The Moscow-1 passive sensor is  times more effective than the Protivnik, with a  range Orion for a target-designation on-the-air defense system, and the Avtobaza-M and Orion+ Avtobaza add high-precision detection. The 1RL220BE versions were reportedly used for jamming. The -range S-200D Dubna (SA-5c) missiles and S-300 P-family radar systems can be used without additional command-and-control centers. S-300 (SA-20A, SA-20B) missiles may also be guided.
A-50 and A-50U aircraft provide early warning and command-and-control target designation.

The 30К6Е control system can be integrated with the S-400 Triumf 98ZH6E system; the S-300PMU2 (through the 83М6Е2 control system); the S-300PMU1 (through the 83М6Е control system); the Tor-M1 through the Ranzhir-M battery-command post; the Pantsir-S1 through the lead battery vehicle. The Protivnik-GE and Gamma-DE radars, integrated with the 92H6E radar system, enables communication between each battery with Baikal-E senior command posts and similar types; nearby 30К6Е, 83М6Е and 83М6Е2 administration systems; the Polyana-D4М1 command post; fighter-aircraft command post, and mobile long-range radars. The system's VHF component provides sector search-and-tracking, with the X- and L-band components providing fine-tracking capability. Good placement of the radars relative to the threat axis enables the L- and X-band components to illuminate the incoming target from angles where the target radar cross-section (RCS) is sub-optimal. The RLM-S and RLM-D have better elevation-tracking accuracy than the RLM-M, and the Nebo M should be capable of producing high-quality tracks suitable for mid-course guidance of modern surface-to-air missiles and trajectory guidance of legacy SAMs.

The Gamma-C1E SHF mobile radar station has a  detection range. All Nebo-family locators are doubled for army air defense. During the 1970s, the long-range mobile UHF 5H87, and SHF 5H69 low-altitude locators were used. The Elbrus-90 computer is used to control the system.

Components
The 91N6E panoramic radar has a declared anti-stealth targeting range of 
Maximum targeting ranges (detection ranges are wider) are:
 For a target with RCS of 4 square metres: 390 km
 For targeting of strategic-bomber sized types: 400 km

The 96L6 high-altitude detector (TSBS) radar and equipment operates independently of the 96L6E low-level radar detector. The 96L6E2 export version can track a maximum of 100 targets, and is resistant to false returns of clutter in mountainous terrain. It can perform the functions of a command post for battalions of S-300 (SA20/20A/20B) or S-400. The 96L6-1 serves as command of S-400 and S-500 batteries. 

Missiles are launched from 5P85TE2 self-propelled launchers or 5P85SE2 trailer launchers operating in conjunction with a BAZ-64022 or MAZ-543M tractor-trailer. A new type of transporter was introduced in 2014 to improve mobility while reducing fuel consumption. The cost of transporters in 2014 is 8.7 million rubles. The MAZ launcher chassis are reportedly of higher quality than the domestic equivalent.

Missiles
One system comprising eight divizion (battalions) can control 72 launchers, with a maximum of 384 missiles (including missiles with a range of less than ). A gas system launches missiles from launch tubes. At  downrange rocket motor ignition activates. Another test recorded a 9M96 missile using an active radar homing head that reached a height of 56 km. All missiles are equipped with directed explosion warheads, which increases the probability of complete destruction of targets. In 2016, Russian anti-aircraft missile troops received upgraded guided missiles for S-300 and S-400 defense systems. The anti-aircraft version of the missile system, designed to destroy aircraft, cruise, and ballistic missiles, can also be used against ground targets. The S-400 is able to intercept cruise missiles at a range of only about 40 km due to their low-altitude flight paths.

 The anti-ballistic missile (ABM) capabilities of the S-400 system are near the maximum allowed under the (now void) Anti-Ballistic Missile Treaty.
 The new anti-ballistic missiles 77N6-N and 77N6-N1 to enter service in 2014 supposedly add inert/kinetic anti-ballistic capability to the system. The same missiles will also be used by the S-500, which has a clearly stated anti-ICBM role.

S-300 system family tree

Morpheus defence system
 A separate independent air defense system, the 42S6 Morfey (Morpheus) is being developed. This system is designated as a short-range air defense system to protect the S-400 from various threats during its terminal phase, and will also act together with the S-350E as a supplement to the S-400. Together, these systems form part of the Russian Aerospace Defence Forces.
 Development of Morfey started in 2007 and was planned to be introduced in 2013, but was delayed until at least 2015. The missile system consists of omnidirectional 29YA6 radar and 36 missiles. The missiles have up to 10 km range and an altitude of up to 3500 m.
 An external independent target system is in the works (RLS "Niobium"). Mobility looks to be in the 5 minute range. It uses multiple frequency capability (band S and UHF) with a declared detection parameter of a 1 square meter RCS at 430 km including a target speed of 8000 km/h (4791 mph, Mach 6.35). The detection system requires the operator to transfer command of targeting to subordinate systems; in this application, the maximum target speed is obtained by use of the subordinate systems.

Specifications

 Types of targets:
 Strategic bombers such as the B-1, FB-111, and B-52H
 Electronic warfare airplanes such as the EF-111A, and EA-6
 Reconnaissance airplanes such as the TR-1
 Early-warning radar airplanes such as the E-3A and E-2C
 Fighter airplanes such as the F-15, F-16, F-22 and F-35
 Ballistic missiles (range up to 3,500 km)
 System response time 9–10 seconds.
 According to the Pravda state newspaper, the price of one battalion (about 7–8 launchers) is US$200 million.

Deployment history

Russia

A regular S-400 battalion consists of up to eight launchers with 32 missiles and a mobile command post. On 21 May 2007 the Russian Air Force announced that S-400 systems would be put on combat duty around Moscow and Central Russia by 1 July 2007. The S-400 was also deployed near the town of Elektrostal.

On 6 August 2007 the first regiment equipped with S-400 systems entered active service in Moscow Oblast near Elektrostal, according to Channel One Russia. The regiment was the 606th Guards Anti-air Rocket Regiment, 9th PVO Division, 1st PVO Corps, of the Special Purpose Command.

On 8 February 2008 Lt. Gen. Vladimir Sviridov announced that Russia would be replacing the S-300 systems in the Northwest of Russia with the S-400. Military experts expect Russia's use of the system as a major component of their ballistic missile defense until 2020.

In September 2006 Deputy Prime Minister Sergei Ivanov announced the purchase of 18 S-400 battalions for internal defense for the period 2007–15.

On 17 March 2009 Russia's defense minister announced that a second regiment equipped with advanced S-400 Triumf air defense missile systems had been put into combat service.

On 26 August 2009 the General Staff said S-400 systems had been deployed in the Russian Far East to counter possible North Korean missile tests and prevent fragments from falling onto Russian territory.

In February 2011 a second unit of S-400 missile systems was deployed at Dubrovki, north of Moscow. The 210th Air Defense Regiment consists of two battalions, each deploying eight launch points of four missiles. In February 2011, it was also announced that the missile system will be deployed in the southern Kuril Islands.

The Baltic Fleet in Kaliningrad received S-400 SAM systems which went into operational status in April 2012. One S-400 divizion is deployed on combat duty in the Russian far east city of Nakhodka.

As of 2012, one system (in Electrostal) was operational, with three more S-400 battalions being deployed. All 56 battalions will be delivered by 2020. Russia is also setting up two regiments of S-400 in the Eastern Military district.

As of September 2013 the Russian Armed Forces had five S-400 regiments: two in Moscow, one in the Pacific fleet, one in the Baltic Fleet, and one in the Southern Military District. Starting in 2014, the army was to receive two to three sets of regimental units of S-400 systems every year. Another S-400 regiment was to be put on combat duty around Moscow by the end of 2013. Russia eventually plans to deploy 28 S-400 regiments by 2020, each comprising two or three battalions with four systems each.

Russia plans to recommission the Kirov-class battlecruiser Admiral Nakhimov in 2023. Plans called for the installation of the 48N6DMK anti-aircraft missile derived from the land-based S-400. Adm. Vladimir Korolev stated at that time that Russia's Northern Fleet's Coastal Forces had deployed S-400s.

On 1 March 2016 the acting commander of the 14th Air Force and Air Defense Army, major general Vladimir Korytkov, said that six S-400 units had been activated at the air defense formation in Russia's Novosibirsk Oblast. TASS also reported that as of the end of 2015, a total of eleven Russian missile regiments were armed with S-400, and by the end of 2016 their number was expected to increase to sixteen.

2015 - Syria

It was reported in November 2015 that S-400s would be deployed to Syria along with the contingent of Russian troops and other military hardware in the course of the air campaign conducted by the Russian forces in support of the Syrian government. However, those claims were refuted by Russia. On 25 November 2015 the Russian government announced it would deploy S-400s in Syria as a response to the downing of its Su-24M jet by Turkey. By the next day, deployment of S-400 air defense systems to Syria was underway. The first S-400 unit was activated at the Khmeimim Air Base in Latakia Governorate. In April and July 2017 a second S-400 unit was activated 13 km northwest of Masyaf, Hama Governorate. Although these systems are located in Syria, they are under the command of the Russian military and not the Syrian (nor Iranian) military, making the Russian government liable if used against another state (that is, its use would be considered an attack by Russia rather than Syria). 

On 22 May 2018 Israeli Air Force commander, Major General Amikam Norkin, reported that Israel became the first country in the world to use the F-35I Adir in combat during recent clashes with Iran in Syria. In mid-2020, several media outlets, including Turkish media, questioned the combat capability of the S-400 air defense system. In late December 2021, the Israeli Air Force flew military jets over areas protected by S-400 and Pantsir SAM in Syria and bombed Iran-backed Hezbollah militia based in Latakia. Russia operates a naval base in the port of Tartus, 85km to the south near the port of Latakia. Considering the engagement range advertised by the Russians, the S-400 could have engaged Israeli aircraft but did not. Neither Russian fighter jets nor the S-400 systems attempted to intercept the Israeli aircraft. It is widely believed that Russia and Israel have an agreement that Israel will guarantee the safety of Russian personnel and assets during its strikes on non-Russian targets in Syria and in return, Russia will not target Israeli aircraft nor repel Israeli strikes.

2022 - Ukraine

According to Ukrainian sources, on 25 February 2022, the Su-27 of Ukrainian Col. Oleksandr Oksanchenko was shot down by an S-400 over Kyiv.

On 14 April 2022, the Russian Defence Ministry stated a Ukrainian Mi-8 was shot down by a S-400 near Horodnia, Chernihiv Oblast on its way to an air base following an attack on Russian territory near Klimovo, Bryansk Oblast.

On 15 October 2022, a S-400 missile crashed or was shot down in the Grayvoronsky District of Belgorod Oblast, Russia.

Belarus
In 2011 State Secretary of the Union State of Russia and Belarus Pavel Borodin stated that Russia will supply the S-400 air defense system to Belarus. On 1 December 2021 Belarus President Alexander Lukashenko, in response to a reporter's question, replied that a Belarusian training center already has S-400 systems. The president said: “Yes. We train our guys in this training center. I'd like to ask the president [of Russia] to leave this system here.” In May 2022 Lukashenko further announced the country bought an undisclosed number of S-400 air defense missile systems.

China
In March 2014, it was announced that Russian President Vladimir Putin had given authorization to sell the S-400 system to China. On 13 April 2015, the chief executive of the Russian state-run arms trader Rosoboronexport confirmed that China secured a contract for the purchase of the S-400 air defense system. Delivery of the system began in January 2018. China test fired Russian S-400 systems for the first time in early August 2018. Deliveries were reportedly postponed after the delivery of two S-400 units. 

The acquisition of S-400, reported to initially consist of six batteries, improves China's air space defense. A reported  coverage range would allow China's defense of the Taiwan Straits and the Diaoyu Islands. Taiwan plans countermeasures using signals intelligence units to locate and destroy S-400 systems before they can be used.

Turkey
In late 2017 Turkish and Russian officials signed a US$2.5 billion agreement for delivery of the S-400 air defense system to Turkey. The US Secretary of State raised concerns over the deal, which were rebuffed by President Erdogan and other Turkish officials, citing the US refusal to sell the upgraded MIM-104 Patriot to Turkey. Turkey received its first installment of the Russian S-400 missile defense system on 12 July 2019. On 17 July 2019, Turkey was suspended from the F-35 program, the US stating "F-35 cannot coexist with a Russian intelligence collection platform that will be used to learn about its advanced capabilities" and on December 14, 2020, the US imposed CAATSA sanctions on Turkey. As of 2020, 4 batteries consisting of 36 fire units, and 192+ missiles were delivered to Turkey.

Turkey has tested the S-400 air defense system against drones and F-16 fighter jets at low altitudes. According to Turkish media, the Turkish military has identified some deficiencies against a slow-moving object at low altitude.  

India 
On 15 October 2016, during the BRICS Summit, India and Russia signed an Inter-governmental Agreement (IGA) for the supply of five S-400 regiments to India. The US$5.43 billion deal (₹40,000 crore) was formally signed on 5 October 2018, ignoring the threat of US sanctions. The deliveries are expected to commence by the end of 2020 and brought into service in October 2020.

In March 2021, U.S. Secretary of Defense Lloyd Austin discussed India's planned purchase of Russia's S-400 air missile system and warned that the purchase of S-400 could trigger CAATSA sanctions. 

In November 2021, Russia stated that it had begun delivery of S-400 missiles to India and that deployment was proceeding as scheduled.

India has already received two S-400 system from Russia and third squadron will be delivered in November 2022. According to reports, that system was delivered in November 2021. Alexander Mikheyev, Rosoboronexport CEO, said “The contract with India is being implemented successfully. In the near future, we will supply a second regiment. The first one has been provided already. More than 200 specialists have been trained. All five regiments will be supplied by the end of 2023”.

Foreign interest
Saudi Arabia
In September 2009 the S-400 was reportedly part of a US$2 billion arms deal between Russia and Saudi Arabia. The Saudis wanted to acquire the more advanced S-400, but Russia was only willing to sell S-300 air defense system at the time. By November 2019 the deal had still not been finalized. Saudi Arabia is no longer considering the Russian S-400 air defense system, following the kingdom’s deal for an American alternative. The American Terminal High Altitude Area Defense (THAAD) system has been cleared for sale to the Saudis by the U.S. State Department cleared the THAAD estimated at $15 billion in 2017 dollars.

Iran
In June 2019 some Iranian officials expressed interest in procuring the S-400 missile system to further improve its defense capabilities along with the previously purchased S-300PMU2. Russia stated at the time it was ready to sell the S-400 system to Iran if an official request was made.

Egypt
In February 2017 Sergey Chemezov, CEO of Rostec, stated that Egypt was interested in the S-400 air defense system. He explained that Russia offered to sell Egypt either the Antey-2500 or S-400. According to Chemezov, the negotiations were delayed due to Egypt's financial issues.

Iraq
In February 2018 Iraqi Minister of Foreign Affairs Ibrahim al-Jaafari confirmed ongoing rumors that his country had shown interest in the S-400 and that negotiations with Russia were underway. In May 2019 Iraq's ambassador to Russia, Haidar Mandour Hadi, said the Iraqi government had decided to procure the S-400 air defense system.

Qatar
In January 2018 Russian state media TASS reported that Qatar was in an advanced state of talks to procure the S-400 air defense system.

United States
In June 2020 United States senator John Thune proposed an amendment to the (ultimately unsuccessful) Senate version of the 2021 National Defense Authorization Act to allow the US Department of Defense to purchase Turkey's S-400 system with funds from the U.S. Army's missile procurement account, thus negating Turkey's contravention of the Countering America's Adversaries Through Sanctions Act of 2017. This was an attempt to allow Turkey to re-enter the F-35 Lightning II acquisition and ownership program.

Serbia
Serbia has also expressed interest in the system.

 Foreign variant 

South Korea
South Korea is developing a simplified medium range SAM system, M-SAM Cheolmae-2, based on technology from the 9M96 missile and with help of the Almaz. The prime contractor is Samsung Thales, a joint venture between Samsung and Thales. The M-SAM will be composed of an X band multi-function radar vehicle built by Samsung Thales in technical cooperation with Almaz, fire-control vehicles, and transporter erector launchers built by Doosan.  Missiles are to be provided by LIG Nex1.

Operators

Current operators

 Belarusian Armed Forces – Contract signed in May 2022 and executed in December.

 People's Liberation Army – Contract signed in September 2014, deliveries of units began in January 2018, and are being inducted.

 Indian Armed Forces – A contract was signed in October 2018 during an official meeting between Russia's President Vladimir Putin and India's Prime Minister Narendra Modi in New Delhi. The deal, worth of $US5.43 billion, includes delivery of the 1st regiment of the S-400 beginning November 2021. India plans to deploy the 1st regiment of the S-400 by April 2022.

 Russian Armed Forces – There were 57 battalions (divizion) deployed with at least 25 regiments as of September 2019.
 Western Military District
 3 battalions of the 210th Anti-Aircraft Rocket Regiment, Dmitrov
 3 battalions of the 606th Anti-Aircraft Rocket Regiment, Elektrostal
 2 battalions of the 93rd Anti-Aircraft Rocket Regiment, Zvenigorod
 2 battalions of the 549th Anti-Aircraft Rocket Regiment, Podolsk
 2 battalions of the 584th Anti-Aircraft Rocket Regiment, Zelenograd
 2 battalions of the 500th Anti-Aircraft Rocket Regiment, Gostilitsy
 2 battalions of the 1488th Anti-Aircraft Rocket Regiment, Zelenogorsk
 2 battalions of the 1489th Anti-Aircraft Rocket Regiment, Vaganovo
 4 battalions of the 1490th Anti-Aircraft Rocket Regiment, Ulyanovka
 2 battalions of the 1544th Anti-Aircraft Rocket Regiment, Luga
 2 battalions of the 183rd Anti-Aircraft Rocket Regiment, Kaliningrad
 2 battalions of the 1545th Anti-Aircraft Rocket Regiment, Kaliningrad Oblast
 Eastern Military District
 2 battalions of the 589th Anti-Aircraft Rocket Regiment, Nakhodka
 3 battalions of the 1532nd Anti-Aircraft Rocket Regiment, Petropavlovsk-Kamchatsky
 2 battalions of the 1533th Anti-Aircraft Rocket Regiment, Vladivostok
 2 battalions of the 1530th Anti-Aircraft Rocket Regiment, Khabarovsk
 2 battalions of the 1724th Anti-Aircraft Rocket Regiment, Yuzhno-Sakhalinsk
 Southern Military District
 2 battalions of the 1536th Anti-Aircraft Rocket Regiment, Rostov-on-Don
 2 battalions of the 1537th Anti-Aircraft Rocket Regiment, Novorossiysk
 2 battalions of the 18th Anti-Aircraft Rocket Regiment, Feodosia, Crimea
 2 battalions of the 12th Anti-Aircraft Rocket Regiment, Sevastopol, Crimea
 Central Military District
 2 battalions of the 590th Anti-Aircraft Rocket Regiment, Novosibirsk
 2 battalions of the 511th Anti-Aircraft Rocket Regiment, Engels
 1 battalion of the 507th Anti-Aircraft Rocket Regiment, Saratov
 2 battalions of the 568th Anti-Aircraft Rocket Regiment, Samara
 2 battalions of the 185th Anti-Aircraft Rocket Regiment, Yekaterinburg
 Northern Military District
 2 battalions of the 33th Anti-Aircraft Rocket Regiment, Rogachevo
 2 battalions of the 531st Anti-Aircraft Rocket Regiment, Murmansk
 2 battalions of the 1528th Anti-Aircraft Regiment, Arkhangelsk Oblast
 3 battalions of the 414th Anti-Aircraft Rocket Regiment, Tiksi

Turkish Air Force: 
Air Defense Command (Hava Savunma Komutanlığı)
S-400 Group Command (S400 Grup Komutanlığı) (Akıncı-Ankara)
15th Missile Base Command (15. Füze Üs Komutanlığı) (Alemdağ-Istanbul)
20th Missile Base Command (20. Füze Üs Komutanlığı'') (Birecik-Şanlıurfa)
Possible future base in Anamur-Mersin

Related
Vityaz missile system
KM-SAM

See also
List of medium-range and long-range SAMs
S-300 missile system
S-300VM missile system
S-350E Vityaz 50R6
S-500 missile system
Medium Extended Air Defense System
L-SAM

Gallery

External links

 S-400 Triumf | CSIS Missile Threat
 www.almaz-antey
 Radar S-400 (basic and potential as Protivnik-GE, Gamma-DE) their exact specifications and photos, indicated target size, height and distance, resistance to interference and anti-stealth capabilities, time to deployment, and other details.
 Almaz S-400 Triumf
 
 A lot of photos of all elements S-400 from various foreshortenings (copy prohibited). Photos can be enlarged fullscreen
 www.ausairpower.net

References

21st-century surface-to-air missiles
Almaz-Antey products
Anti-ballistic missiles of Russia
Military equipment introduced in the 2000s
Missile defense
Surface-to-air missiles of Russia